James Barrett Galanes (born August 28, 1956, in Brattleboro, Vermont) is an American former Nordic combined and cross-country skier. He competed at the 1976 Winter Olympics, the 1980 Winter Olympics, and the 1984 Winter Olympics.

Galanes finished 14th in the 30 km event at the 1982 FIS Nordic World Ski Championships in Oslo. His best World Cup finish was fifth in a 15 km event in the Soviet Union in 1984.

Cross-country skiing results
All results are sourced from the International Ski Federation (FIS).

Olympic Games

World Championships

World Cup

Season standings

References

External links
 
 Olympic 4 x 10 km relay results: 1936–2002 

1956 births
Living people
American male Nordic combined skiers
American male cross-country skiers
Olympic Nordic combined skiers of the United States
Olympic cross-country skiers of the United States
Nordic combined skiers at the 1976 Winter Olympics
Cross-country skiers at the 1980 Winter Olympics
Cross-country skiers at the 1984 Winter Olympics
People from Brattleboro, Vermont
Sportspeople from Vermont
20th-century American people